Arreaga is a surname. Notable people with the surname include:

Brandon Arreaga (born 1999), American singer
Luis Arreaga (born 1952), Guatemalan diplomat and government official